Manuel Guerrero may refer to:

Manuel Flores Leon Guerrero, Governor of the U.S. territory of Guam from 1963 to 1969
Manuel Amador Guerrero, first president of Panama (1904 to 1908)
Manuel Guerrero (basketball), Argentine basketball player
Manuel Guerrero (footballer), Chilean footballer
Manuel S. Guerrero, Filipino doctor